Leskeaceae is a family of mosses belonging to the order Hypnales.

Genera
As recognised by World Flora Online (2022);
 Bryonorrisia L.R.Stark & W.R.Buck (2 species)
 Chileobryon Enroth (1 species)
 Duthiella  (18 species)
 Fabronidium Müll. Hal. (2 species)
 Habrodon Schimp. (4 species)
 Iwatsukiella W.R. Buck & H.A. Crum
 Lescuraea Schimp. (31 species)
 Leskea Hedw. (113 species)
 Leskeadelphus Herzog (2 species)
 Leskeella (Limpr.) Loeske (11 species)
 Lesquereuxia 
 Lindbergia Kindb. (21 species)
 Mamillariella Laz.
 Orthoamblystegium Dixon & Sakurai
 Pseudodimerodontium (Broth.) Broth.
 Pseudoleskea Bruch & Schimp. (80 species)
 Pseudoleskeella Kindb. (27 species)
 Pseudoleskeopsis Broth. (21 species)
 Rigodiadelphus Dixon (2 species)
 Schwetschkea Müll. Hal. (30 species)

GBIF also lists Neolescuraea

References

Hypnales
Moss families